Moana Hope (born 14 February 1988) is a former professional Australian rules footballer who played in the AFL Women's competition from 2017 to 2019, including 13 matches over two seasons at  and a further seven matches over one season at . Each followed an extended career at state-league level before the creation of a national league.

Early life
Hope hails from the suburb of Broadmeadows, in Melbourne's north. She is of New Zealand, German and Australian heritage, and has 14 siblings in total.

Hope began playing Australian football competitively at the age of seven, playing with boys teams at Glenroy through under-12s. Without a viable youth girls league to join, Hope immediately progressed to playing senior women's football with Hadfield at the age of thirteen. She played representative football for Victoria at age 16, and captained the state side at under-19 level. She was also a member of the Australia women's international rules football team that played against Ireland in the 2006 Ladies' International Rules Series.

Hope was also an accomplished junior cricketer, representing Victoria through to under-19 level. She chose to give up the sport in favour of Australian football.

State league football
Hope has played premier division Australian football in the VWFL for the Darebin Falcons and St Kilda Sharks. She is a multiple competition leading goalkicker. She has also played for Melbourne University.

She would go on to play for the club in representative exhibition matches for the next three years. In 2016, she kicked six goals in the victorious  side against  in the women's all-stars game in September.

In the 2016 season she kicked over 100 goals, the first ever player to do so in the VFL Women's.

AFL Women's career

She made her debut in round 1 in the club and the league's inaugural match at Ikon Park against . Hope finished the season having played in all seven of Collingwood's matches and kicking seven goals, leading the Magpies' goalkicking and equal sixth-highest league-wide. Hope was later re-signed for the 2018 season in the May 2017 trade period. In late August she was added as an injury replacement player in the Victorian side for the upcoming State of Origin exhibition match. She kicked one goal in her state's 97-point win over The Allies.

After a disappointing personal performance she was dropped from the club's round 2 side to face  at Optus Stadium the following week.

On 18 May 2018, it was announced that Hope had been signed by North Melbourne, who entered the AFL Women's competition in 2019. In April 2019, North Melbourne announced that they had delisted Hope following the conclusion of the 2019 season.

Statistics

|- style="background-color: #eaeaea"
! scope="row" style="text-align:center" | 2017
|
| 23 || 7 || 7 || 8 || 29 || 7 || 36 || 14 || 6 || 1.0 || 1.1 || 4.1 || 1.0 || 5.1 || 2.0 || 0.9
|-
! scope="row" style="text-align:center" | 2018
|style="text-align:center;"|
| 23 || 6 || 8 || 5 || 41 || 11 || 52 || 17 || 5 || 1.3 || 0.8 || 6.8 || 1.8 || 8.7 || 2.8 || 0.8
|- style="background-color: #eaeaea"
! scope="row" style="text-align:center" | 2019
|
| 23 || 7 || 8 || 4 || 33 || 7 || 40 || 16 || 8 || 1.1 || 0.6 || 4.7 || 1.0 || 5.7 || 2.3 || 1.1
|- class="sortbottom"
! colspan=3| Career
! 20
! 23
! 17
! 103
! 25
! 128
! 47
! 19
! 1.2
! 0.9
! 5.2
! 1.3
! 6.4
! 2.4
! 1.0
|}

Personal life
Hope published her memoir, My Way, in 2017.

On 17 August 2019, Hope married model Isabella Carlstrom in Melbourne. Carlstrom gave birth to their first child on November 17, 2020, Hope gave birth to a boy on June 26, 2022.

Australian Survivor
In 2018, Hope appeared as a contestant on Australian Survivor: Champions vs. Contenders, competing in the fifth season of the competitive reality television series Australian Survivor as part of the Champions tribe. Hope formed many strong relationships, notably with fellow contestants Mat Rogers and Sharn Coombes and also found a Hidden Immunity Idol. In the tribe's first tribal council, Hope led the blindside of American Survivor contestant Russell Hantz. On day 16, Hope asked her tribemates to vote her out at tribal council because of an illness. The tribe followed through on Hope's request and she finished the game in 19th place.

Hope returned for Australian Survivor: All Stars and got far into the game, forming an alliance with the extremely popular eventual winner David Genat. However, she repeatedly refused to vote out Genat, who was the sole vote to remove her from the game at final 3, leaving Hope in third place.

Filmography

Television

References

External links

Living people
1988 births
Collingwood Football Club (AFLW) players
Sportswomen from Victoria (Australia)
Australian rules footballers from Melbourne
Lesbian sportswomen
Australian LGBT sportspeople
North Melbourne Football Club (AFLW) players
LGBT players of Australian rules football
Australian Survivor contestants
Australia women's international rules football team players
Melbourne University Football Club (VFLW) players
Darebin Falcons players
People from Broadmeadows, Victoria